Anduzedoras oxyrhynchus is the only species in the genus Anduzedoras of the catfish (order Siluriformes) family Doradidae. This species originates from the Rio Negro and upper Orinoco River basins of Brazil and Venezuela and reaches a length of  SL.

References

Doradidae
Fish of South America
Fish of Brazil

Taxa named by Achille Valenciennes
Fish described in 1821